Freedom is a major furniture and homewares retail chain with 58 stores across Australia and New Zealand.

The chain was previously owned by marathon runner and race car driver Warren Higgs. It is currently owned and operated by Greenlit Brands.

The first Australian store opened in 1981.

The first New Zealand store opened in 1996. The New Zealand arm had 13 stores by 2008. and 15 stores by 2009. In 2023 Freedom saw the closure of 2 New Zealand stores; Palmerston North & Taupō. Leaving 12 remaining stores around New Zealand including five in Auckland.

See also 
 Steinhoff International

References

External links 
  – Australia
  – New Zealand

Furniture retailers of Australia
Furniture retailers of New Zealand
Companies based in Sydney
Retail companies established in 1981
Australian companies established in 1981